The Venezuelan Episcopal Conference (CEV) is a permanent institution. Its stated aim is, according to Second Vatican Council, associated with the Bishops of the Republic to exercise together, as an expression of collegial spirit, certain pastoral functions on the faithful of their territory and to promote according to the rule of law, the greater good which the Catholic Church offers humankind, especially through forms and programs of the apostolate fittingly adapted to the circumstances of time and place.

Base teacher
The documents outline the very life and work of the 113 Episcopal Conferences, currently in the world, are: "Lumen gentium" (23), "Christus Dominus" (37-38), "Ecclesiae Imago" (211), "Sanctae Ecclesiae" (41), "Apostolos Suos" and the 1983 Code of Canon Law (cn. 447-459).

The decree Christus Dominus of Vatican II, on the Pastoral Office of Bishops in the Church (approved on October 28, 1965), devotes Chapter III Cooperation of Bishops to the common good of the other Churches. In particular, the numbers 37 and 38 refer to the Episcopal Conferences. Previously, the decree specifies: "From the first centuries of the Church, the bishops who were in charge of particular churches, moved by the communion of fraternal charity and zeal for the universal mission entrusted to the Apostles, joined forces and wills to promote the good of the particular Churches. " (Cf. 36).
Further emphasizes that, in modern times, the bishops find it very difficult to fulfill in a timely and fruitful mission "but work closely together with other bishops." The Council reminds the institution, in some nations, of the Episcopal Conferences, which have allowed a more coordinated and apostolate, therefore, more fruitful, so that "this sacred Council thinks should be large so that in all the earth, the Bishops of the same nation or region are grouped into single board (assembly), meeting at stated times, in order to communicate the lights of prudence and experience, to deliberate together to form a holy force cooperation for the common good of the churches "(cf. 37).
Immediately enacts, among other things, concerning: - the objectives of the Episcopal Conference (cf. 38, 1), - to whom belong to them (cf. 38, 2) - to the rules: Each Conference shall prepare their own, to be approved by the Apostolic See, and shall be laid in the various agencies that compose it (cf. 38, 3), - the decisions made, so when they are approved and shall be binding (cf. 38, 4); In accordance with the provisions of Council's decree, it should proceed in each country, to organize the respective Episcopal Conferences.

In July 1973 (see Church of Venezuela, Year I, No. 1), see the Bulletin of the Permanent Secretariat of the Bishops of Venezuela. In this Bulletin is collected, from birth, all concerning the Venezuelan Episcopal Conference.
Indeed, in No. 2 (November 1973, p. 15-20), broadly outlined the Plenary Meeting of the Venezuelan Episcopal Conference, held from 9 to July 14, 1973-sort of constituent -. On pages 15 to 20 of this issue, disclosed the STATUTES OF THE VENEZUELAN BISHOPS, preceded by a brief note that says: The Venezuelan Episcopal Conference, on the 12th. Meeting of its last Plenary Assembly (14/07/73) approved the new statutes of the same ... And he adds: Here are the new Constitution, preceded by the Decree of the Sacred Congregation for Bishops for which are ratified. On the next page published (in Latin) to the Decree of the Sacred Congregation for Bishops, issued in Rome on September 29, 1973, are the statutes, which include the following chapters:
1. PURPOSE AND ORGANS OF THE CONFERENCE.
2. PLENARY ASSEMBLY.
3. PERMANENT CENTRAL COMMITTEE
4. SPECIAL COMMISSIONS
5. SECRETARIAD PERMANENT.
6. MISCELLANEOUS.
FIRST ASSEMBLY PLENARY MEETING OF THE VENEZUELAN BISHOPS, under the new Constitution, was held from 7 to 12 January 1974, starting the enumeration of the Episcopal Assemblies currently in effect. The Venezuelan Episcopal Conference consisted of:

Archbishops

Cardinal José Humberto Quintero, Archbishop of Caracas, Honorary President of the ESC
Bishop Benitez Fontúrvel Clench, Archbishop of Barquisimeto, President of the CEV.
Monsignor Crisanto Mata Cova, Archbishop of Ciudad Bolivar.
Bishop Juan Jose Bernal Archbishop-Bishop of Los Teques
Bishop Domingo Roa Pérez, archbishop of Maracaibo
Archbishop Angel Perez Cisneros, Archbishop of Mérida
Bishop Joseph Ali Lebrún, Archbishop Coadjutor with right of succession and Apostolic Administrator 'full seat' of Caracas, Vice President of the CEV.

Bishops
Bishop Francis Joseph Iturriza, Bishop of Coro
Archbishop José Rincón Bonilla, Auxiliary Bishop of Caracas
Bishop Alejandro Fernandez Feo, Bishop of San Cristobal
Second Bishop García, Vicar Apostolic of Puerto Ayacucho
Bishop Miguel Aurrecoechea, Vicar Apostolic of Machiques
Argimiro Bishop García, Vicar Apostolic of Tucupita
Archbishop Antonio José Ramírez, Bishop of Maturin
Bishop Miguel Antonio Salas, Bishop of Calabozo
Bishop Jose Rojas Leo, Bishop of Trujillo
Bishop Luis Eduardo Henriquez, Bishop of Valencia
Bishop Feliciano Gonzalez, Bishop of Maracay
Bishop Thomas Marquez Gomez, Bishop of San Felipe
Bishop Eduardo Herrera Riera, Auxiliary Bishop of Barquisimeto
Bishop Rafael A. R. Gonzalez, Bishop of Barinas
Maradei Bishop Constantine, Bishop of Barcelona
Bishop Mariano Parra Leon, Bishop of Cumana
Monsignor Angel Rodriguez Polachini, Bishop of Guanare
Bishop Marcial Ramirez Ponce, Auxiliary Bishop of Caracas
Bishop Francisco de Guruceaga, Bishop of La Guaira and Apostolic Administrator of Margarita
Monsignor Mariano Gutierrez, Vicar Apostolic of Santa Elena de Wairén
Monsignor Marco Tulio Ramírez Roa, Bishop of Cabimas
Bishop Ramon Ovidio Perez Morales, Auxiliary Bishop of Caracas, Secretary General
Archbishop Romero Luzardo Medard, Bishop of San Carlos
Bishop Roberto Davila Uzcátegui, Prelate of San Fernando de Apure
Bishop Rosalio Castillo Lara, Bishop Coadjutor with right of succession of Trujillo

Directive
Presidency of the CEV. January 2009 - January 2012. Standing Committee

President Hon. Archbishop Ubaldo Ramón Santana Sequera, Archbishop of Maracaibo
1st. Vice President Hon. Archbishop Baltazar Porras Cardozo, Archbishop of Mérida
2nd. Vice President Hon. Bishop Robert Lückert Leon, Archbishop of Coro
Secretary General. Bishop Jesus Gonzalez de Zarate, Auxiliary Bishop of Caracas

Members of the CEV
Members of the Venezuelan Episcopal Conference (CEV) are: 
All residential Archbishops and Bishops, Administrators and Vicars Apostolic Diocesan Administrators and others who by right are equal to Diocesan Bishops.
The Archbishops and Bishops Coadjutor and Auxiliary.
Headline Bishops who exercise a pastoral office to serve the whole Church in Venezuela, on behalf of the Holy See or the Episcopal Conference. (Art. No. 2)

Organization
Plenary Assembly: supreme body of the CEV, consisting of all members of the CEV.
Episcopal Commissions: Official study, monitoring and counseling, which provides for the CEV to meet the various pastoral fields.
Standing Committee: Its purpose is to review and monitor the implementation and enforcement of the pastoral plan.
Permanent Secretariat (SPEV) is a service agency of the Bishops Conference responsible for reporting, implement and coordinate the decisions and activities programadas.

References

External links
 https://web.archive.org/web/20080907024839/http://www.cev.org.ve/docs/organigrama_20062009.pdf
 https://web.archive.org/web/20090426093839/http://www.caritas.org.ve/
 https://web.archive.org/web/20120929053235/http://www.cev.org.ve/somos_06c.php
 https://www.catholicer.com/profile/9201

Venezuela
Catholic Church in Venezuela